Otto Biba (born 9 August 1946) is an Austrian musicologist and archive director of the Gesellschaft der Musikfreunde in Vienna.

Career 
Born in Vienna, after studying history and musicology (doctorate University of Vienna in 1974), Biba has been working in the field of musicology since 1973 in the Gesellschaft der Musikfreunde archive, library and collections. In 1979, he succeeded Hedwig Mitringer as its director. Since then, he has been active as a scholarly author, editor of musical works, exhibition curator and lecturer in Vienna and internationally. As a researcher, he was particularly concerned with Joseph Haydn, Franz Schubert and Johannes Brahms, but also with the Piarists order and with Gottfried von Einem. Biba has published over 120 editions of compositions.

References

Further reading 
 Elisabeth Th. Hilscher-Fritz: Biba, Otto. In Oesterreichisches Musiklexikon. Online edition, Vienna 2002 ff., ; Print edition: Vol. 1, Österreichischen Akademie der Wissenschaften press , Vienna 2002, .
 Ingrid Fuchs (ed.): Festschrift Otto Biba zum 60. Geburtstag. Schneider, Tutzing 2006,  (with Schriftenverzeichnis Otto Biba bis 2006)

External links 
 
 Publikationsliste Otto Bibas [PDF]
 Porträtphoto 1996

Austrian musicologists
1946 births
Living people
Writers from Vienna